Goonyella Riverside Mine is a large open cut coking coal mine in the Bowen Basin. It is one of many coal mines in Central Queensland, Australia and is located at Moranbah about 30 km north of the township. The mine produced 12.4 million tonnes of metallurgical coal from July 2012 to June 2013. It is owned by BHP Mitsubishi Alliance. The Goonyella Upper Seam, the Goonyella Middle Seam and the Goonyella Lower Seam are all mined at the site. The coal is well known for its great coking characteristics. Much of the coal was such a high grade, the wash plants were often programmed to add ash to meet the contracted export quality targets.

History

The Goonyella Mine was developed by Central Queensland Coal Associates, (Utah International Corporation 85% and Mitsubishi Development Co 15%) before being sold to BHP. Operations commenced in 1971 at Goonyella while mining began at Riverside in 1982.

On 12 November 2019, BMA Operations announced that it would automate 86 Komatsu Trucks by 2020. The announcement was openly criticised by the CFMEU Mining & Energy Division and the Queensland Opposition Leader Deb Frecklington who stated that approvals to the mine operation should be reviewed.

The mine is colour coded to "Goonyella Green", and the haul trucks were given names of racehorses.

Coal is exported by the Goonyella railway line via Hay Point to markets worldwide.

Safety at Goonyella Riverside mine 
The mine has recorded four fatal accidents since 1990

See also

Coal mining in Australia
List of mines in Australia

References

1971 establishments in Australia
BHP
Coal mines in Queensland
Mines in Central Queensland
Mitsubishi
Open-pit mines
Surface mines in Australia